Ana Ríus Armendáriz is a Puerto Rican politician who was Secretary of Health of Puerto Rico in the Cabinet of Puerto Rico.

Education 
Ana went to the University of Puerto Rico School of Medicine, with a degree in anesthesiology. Soon after that, she became an intern in the VA Medical Center, specializing in internal medicine.

Post Graduation 
Dr. Armendáriz became a professor of Anesthesiology the University of Puerto Rico School of Medicine. During her 28-year stint, she managed to teach hundreds of students about the field. After moving on from teaching, she was appointed as executive director of the Puerto Rico Medical Services Administration from November 2002 to February 2009. She then went back to teaching, until she was appointed as Secretary of Health.

Secretary of Health of Puerto Rico 
Dr. Armendáriz was appointed as Secretary of Health on September 16, 2013, by Governor Alejandro García Padilla.

Medical Marijuana 
On May 4, 2015, Puerto Rico legalized medical marijuana. Dr. Armendariz worked to ensure that there would be appropriate regulations concerning the legalization, including: how it'll be dispensed, what diagnosis will be required, and who will produce it.

Dr. Armendariz also drew up a plan as to when marijuana will be allowed into the territory. She issued that suppliers can start their distribution as early as August, 2015.

Zika 
In early 2015, the Zika outbreak struck Puerto Rico. She expressed the following views of the Zika Epidemic to Outbreak News Today, "The virus is transmitted by the mosquito Aedes aegypti, the same mosquito that transmits dengue and chikungunya. That is why we want to educate the population about their symptoms and prevention measures to be taken"

References

Year of birth missing (living people)
Living people
Members of the 16th Cabinet of Puerto Rico
Secretaries of Health of Puerto Rico
Puerto Rican anesthesiologists
Puerto Rican women physicians
Women anesthesiologists
21st-century American women physicians
21st-century American physicians